GOOD TV (Chinese: 好消息電視台) (stylized in all uppercase), is a Christian television station in Taiwan.  Established in 1997 as a nonprofit organization under Gabriel Evangelical Broadcasting Foundation, it began broadcast on September 9, 1998.  The executive director of programming is Pastor Shao-en Koh, and its spokesman was the belated former actor Sun Yueh.

On July 1, 2012, Good TV moved from the Public Television Service building in Taipei's Neihu District to New Taipei City's Zhonghe District.

Channels 
Good TV operates two channels, Good TV, and Good TV 2 (logo as "Good 2").

Good TV Variety Channel
The Good TV Channel ("Variety Channel" in Chinese) broadcasts programs of general interest, including shows on family relationships, children's topics, food and lifestyle, science, sermons, Christian news, and Christian testimonies.

Originally named "Good TV 1", it broadcasts throughout Taiwan and began broadcast on September 9, 1998 on Channel 15 HD in Taiwan's cable television systems. On July 12, 2012, starting at 9:00 AM Taiwan Time, the station on Chunghwa Telecom's MOD Channel 3 switched to HD broadcast signal.

Good TV 2 
Good TV 2 (identified as "GOOD 2" on screen) focuses on Biblical teachings, sermons, and testimonies of Christians who share their stories about their life transformation before and after Christian conversion.

The station originally broadcast mainly outside of Taiwan, serving overseas Chinese diaspora.  Now it serves both domestic and worldwide audiences.

On August 30, 2005, Republic of China's (Taiwan's) Executive Yuan Satellite TV Review Commission approved Good TV 2's application for broadcast. Four years later, Good TV 2 began broadcast at noon on July 31, 2009, at Chunghwa Telecom MOD Channel 15, replacing Good TV 1.

In October 2012, Good TV 2's Chinese name changed to "Good TV Truth Channel", and became available on the 15th that month on digital Channel 212  on cable providers Kbro (凱擘大寬頻) and Taiwan Fixed Network (TFN, 台灣固網).

Beginning February 1, 2018, the station became available on digital channel 131 on cable TV systems operated by China Network Systems (中嘉寬頻公司).

Programming 
Among its many programs are shows on Christian life, Biblical teachings and sermons from Taiwan and overseas, including the United States, and interviews and testimonials by Christian celebrities, pastors and theologians, and lay Christians.

When foreign programs are in non-Chinese languages, translated Chinese subtitles are provided on screen. In addition, many programs, particularly sermons, Sunday worship services, and televangelism programs from the U.S. are usually dubbed into Mandarin Chinese.

One of its popular programs is "Real Sentiments Blog" (Chinese: 真情部落格), and has featured testimonies of Taiwanese badminton player Chou Tien-chen and Taiwanese American basketball player Jeremy Lin.

References

External links

 Good TV Taiwan
 Good TV USA
 

Commercial-free television networks
Television stations in Taiwan
Television channels and stations established in 1998
Christianity in Taiwan
Evangelical television networks
Christian television networks
Christian mass media companies